The Greenville Hunters were a Texas League (1906), North Texas League (1907) and East Texas League (1924-1926) baseball team based in Greenville, Texas. Pepper Martin played for them.

References

Baseball teams established in 1906
Defunct minor league baseball teams
1906 establishments in Texas
Defunct baseball teams in Texas
North Texas League teams
Defunct Texas League teams
East Texas League teams